Ralph Borsodi (December, 1888 – October 27, 1977) was an American agrarian theorist and practical experimenter interested in ways of living useful to the modern family desiring greater self-reliance (especially so during the Great Depression). Much of his theory related to living in rural surroundings on a modern homestead and was rooted in his Georgist beliefs.

Life and work
He spent the early years of his life in Manhattan. His father William was a publisher who had connections in the advertising field, and Ralph worked in this business as a boy. By the age of 22, Borsodi was personally testing the idea of moving "back to the land." He had fully embraced the concept of simple living by 1920. Borsodi was influenced by the reformer Bolton Hall (1854–1938), a friend of his father's; Hall introduced Borsodi to the ideas of the economist Henry George. Borsodi was also influenced by Thomas Jefferson, Arthur Schopenhauer, Friedrich Nietzsche, Josiah Warren, Lysander Spooner, Benjamin Tucker, and Laurance Labadie.

Borsodi is chiefly known for his practical experiments in self-sufficient living during the 1920s and 1930s, and for the books he wrote about these experiments. The Distribution Age (1927), This Ugly Civilization (1929), and Flight from the City (1933) are his best known works. He established a School of Living in Rockland County, New York, during the winter of 1934–1935. Before long about 20 families began attending regularly from New York City, spending the weekends at the school. Some commentators claim Borsodi’s books inspired "hundreds of thousands of people" to follow his example during the Great Depression.

Borsodi launched a community land trust in 1935 as a practical test of his ideas. He set up the non-profit Independence Foundation, Inc., with Chauncey Stillman and others, which acquired a tract of about 40 acres of land on Bayard Lane near Suffern, New York. The homes were owned individually, but the land cooperatively. A different group interested in forming a similar community land trust at Stillwater in Ossining, New York, then contacted Borsodi. The Stillwater project was unfortunately abandoned by the Independence Foundation in the early stages as unreasonably large, although it did develop along lines similar to Bayard Lane.

In 1937 Borsodi, with Herbert Agar and Chauncey Stillman started a journal called Free America, which advocated local agrarian democracy. In 1948 Borsodi self-published (even doing his own typesetting) Education and Living, a two-volume work designed to suggest a  curriculum for the ongoing School of Living. In 1950, Borsodi moved to the Town of Melbourne Village, whose founders had been influenced by his teachings.  Mildred Loomis, his most devoted student, continued the work of the School of Living into the 1970s when it was headquartered at Heathcote Community in Freeland, Maryland.

With Bob Swann, Borsodi created a land trust that functioned as an economic, banking, and credit institution, probably influenced by the ideas of Josiah Warren. Called the Independence Foundation, Inc., Borsodi intended it as a new and ethical way of making low-cost, cooperatively shared credit available to people who wanted to build homesteads in the community. This institution made it possible to provide people access to land without their having to pay outright for property in the beginning.

Borsodi spent decades analyzing the ills of modern society and imagining remedies for the problems. His 1968 work, published in India, and titled Seventeen Universal Problems of Man and Society, catalogued his research and can be considered the beginning of a modern taxonomy of human problems and solutions. His followers felt he usually was working at solving problems at least 20 years before most analysts realized the problem existed. For example, it is said he predicted the inflation of the 1970s some thirty years before it came. One of his interests was in local currency, and he started an experiment with such a currency in his home area, Exeter, New Hampshire; however, the project came to an early end with Borsodi's failing health. He created a commodity-backed bartering currency called the Constant, reminiscent of Josiah Warren's "labor notes" at the Cincinnati Time Store. These appeared first as paper notes, but in 1974, coin-like pieces, called Globes, were minted and sold in 1/2 ounce and 1 ounce .999 silver denominations. The non-profit organization that sponsored them was the International Foundation for Independence, Inc., but the Globes were minted and sold by an organization called Arbitrage International.

Borsodi died in Exeter, New Hampshire, in October 1977, survived by his wife Clare and two sons - Edward M. and Ralph W. - by his first wife Myrtle Mae Simpson.

Influence
Borsodi was cited as an important modern critic and creative thinker by Helen and Scott Nearing in such writings as Living the Good Life, a book sometimes credited as being the clarion call of the back-to-the-land movement of the 1970s. J.I. Rodale, who founded Organic Gardening and Farming magazine got his introduction to organic gardening at Borsodi's Dogwood Acres Homestead, as did the Keene family, founders of Walnut Acres organic food catalog. Borsodi was also a significant influence on the American libertarian movement.

A number of Borsodi's texts can be found in the Social Criticism section of the Soil and Health Online Library.

Selected works
 National advertising vs. prosperity a study of the economic consequences of national advertising (1923)
 The Distribution Age (1927).
 This Ugly Civilization (1929).
 Flight from the City (1933).
 Prosperity and Security, A Study in Realistic Economics (1938)
The time has come : an open letter to the teachers of mankind on the question of war and peace and the creation of a really new world order (1942) 
 Inflation Is Coming (1948)
  Education and Living (1948
 The Challenge of Asia : A Study of Conflicting Ideas and Ideals (1956)
 The Definition of Definition: A New Linguistic Approach to the Integration of Knowledge (1967)
 This Ugly Civilization: 90th Anniversary Edition (2019)
 Homestead notes a Journal, published by the School of Living, 1933-?

See also
 Agrarianism
 Bolton Hall (activist)
 Georgism
 Stephen Pearl Andrews
Paul Wheaton
Subsistence Homesteads Division

References

External links

 The School of Living
 Heathcote Community
 This Ugly Civilization Website

Available at Soil and Health Online Library:
 The Distribution Age (1927)
 This Ugly Civilization (1929)
   Flight from the City (1933)
 1974 interview

1888 births
1977 deaths
American agronomists
Economists from New York (state)
American libertarians
Green thinkers
Writers from New York City
20th-century American economists
Organic gardeners
Georgist economists